This is a round-up of the 2003 Sligo Senior Football Championship. Curry ended a 31-year wait for Championship glory, defeating holders Eastern Harps in the decider.

Group stages

The Championship was contested by 14 teams, divided into four groups. The top two sides in each group advanced to the quarter-finals, with the remaining sides facing the Relegation playoffs to retain Senior status for 2004.

Group A

Group B

Group C

Group D

Playoff

There was one playoff required, in Group C where Castleconnor surprised the 2000 Champions Bunninadden to win by a point.

Quarterfinals

Semi-finals

Last eight

Sligo Senior Football Championship Final

Relegation

References
 Sligo Champion (July–October 2003)
 Sligo Weekender (July–October 2003)

Sligo Senior Football Championship
Sligo Senior Football Championship